Bafoussam Airport  is an airport serving Bafoussam, capital of the West Province of Cameroon.

Airlines and destinations

References

External links
 

Airports in Cameroon